Barricade is a 1950 American Technicolor Western film directed by Peter Godfrey and written by William Sackheim. The film stars Dane Clark, Raymond Massey, Ruth Roman, Robert Douglas, Morgan Farley and Walter Coy. The film was released by Warner Bros. on March 18, 1950.

Plot
Gold-mine operator "Boss" Kruger (Raymond Massey) has certainly earned his nickname. A frontier dictator, Kruger runs his mine like a prison colony. Most of his workers are, in fact, fugitives from justice and are given dubious "protection" by Kruger. Two of the laborers are Judith Burns (Ruth Roman) and Bob Peters (Dane Clark), both on the lam from the law. Judith and Bob befriend lawyer Aubrey Milburn (Robert Douglas), who seeks to prove that Kruger is a murderer.

Cast 
 Dane Clark as Bob Peters
 Raymond Massey as Boss Kruger
 Ruth Roman as Judith Burns
 Robert Douglas as Aubrey Milburn
 Morgan Farley as The Judge
 Walter Coy as Benson
 George Stern as Tippy
 Robert Griffin as Kirby
 Frank Marlowe as Brandy
 Tony Martínez as Peso

References

External links 
 
 
 
 

1950 films
Warner Bros. films
American Western (genre) films
1950 Western (genre) films
Films directed by Peter Godfrey
Films scored by William Lava
Films about mining
1950s English-language films
1950s American films